Daniel Chonkadze (1830 – June 16, 1860) was a Georgian novelist primarily known for his resonant novella Suramis tsikhe ("Surami Fortress").

Chonkadze was born to a peasant family near Dusheti. His native village housed a mixed Georgian-Ossetian community, a prerequisite for the future writer's lively interest in both Georgian and Ossetian folk traditions. Educated at the seminaries of Vladikavkaz and Tbilisi, Chonkadze then taught Ossetic in Stavropol and Tbilisi in the 1850s. Simultaneously he served as a church official, but would later abandon his clerical status. Much of his work was on Georgian and Ossetic folklore. He authored an unfinished Russian-Ossetic dictionary, and wrote down a collection of Ossetic proverbs using an alphabet invented by Professor Andreas Sjögren for the Ossetians. For this reason, he is considered by some to have been "a founder-father of Ossetic literature".

Chonkadze’s first and last published work, Suramis tsikhe, garnered a long-lasting success. Published in 1859/60 in the Georgian literary journal Tsiskari ("Dawn"), the novella is a mixture of folklore, history, political protest, and romantic drama in which Chonkadze passionately attacks serfdom. For censorship reasons, the tale was given a medieval setting filled with allegories. The contemporary socio-political system is symbolized by the crumbling Surami fortress that requires a living person to be buried within its walls to stand firm. The novel was filmed by the eminent Armenian filmmaker Sergei Parajanov who directed his multi-award-winning The Legend of Suram Fortress in the 1980s. Chonkadze died of tuberculosis at the age of thirty, and many of his writings were destroyed by his relatives as a potential source of infection.

References 
 

Chonkadze, Daniel, Dictionary of Georgian National Biography. Retrieved on February 19, 2007.

1830 births
1860 deaths
Male writers from Georgia (country)
19th-century deaths from tuberculosis
19th-century writers from Georgia (country)
Novelists from Georgia (country)
19th-century novelists
19th-century male writers
People from Mtskheta-Mtianeti
Tuberculosis deaths in Georgia (country)